Armchair theorizing, armchair philosophizing, or armchair scholarship is an approach to providing new developments in a field that does not involve primary research and the collection of new information – but instead analysis or synthesis of existent scholarship, and the term is typically pejorative, implying such scholarship is weak or frivolous.

Commentary and analysis 
Different disciplines place different weights on purely theoretical research. Some anthropologists argue that purely theoretical anthropological research is outdated and that ethnographic fieldwork should be a necessary part of anthropological research. On the other hand, some commentators argue that economic theories are designed to explain and predict economic phenomena, which requires analysis and synthesis, and not necessarily collection, of data.  Leland B. Yeager even argues that economists can legitimately extrapolate from their own personal observations to design new theories.  In this sense, Yeager sees armchair theorizing as something more than the "mere sterile juggling of arbitrary assumptions," arguing that even without a traditional scientific method or field work, the practice can still be done in a manner that draws on "a sound empirical basis."
 
While armchair scholarship contrasts with the scientific method, which inherently involves the active investigation of nature through data collection, armchair philosophers and theorizers can assist in formulating theories that explain observations; these theories can then be tested with further scientific investigation. While the methods of an armchair philosopher are different from an empirical scientist, they can complement each other to produce new insights or necessary truths. 

A major critic of armchair theorizing was the anthropologist Bronisław Malinowski, whose views are often summarized in the saying "[come] off the verandah", encouraging fieldwork and participant observation.

See also
 A priori and a posteriori
 Armchair warrior
 Logical truth

Notes

References

External links 
 Discussion of On the Politics of Accounting Disclosure and Measurement: An Analysis of Economic Incentives, Dale Morse, Journal of Accounting Research, Vol. 19, Studies on Standardization of Accounting Practices: An Assessment of Alternative Institutional Arrangements (1981), pp. 36–42,  
 Planning Theory, In Defense of Armchair Theorizing, Seymour J. Mandelbaum,  

Economic methodology
Philosophical methodology
Philosophical theories
Metaphors referring to objects